Parahelicoprion is an extinct genus of shark-like  eugeneodontid holocephalids from the Permian of the Ural Mountains (Russia) and Copacabana Formation, Bolivia. The genus name, from "nearly coiled saw" in Greek, directly refers to Helicoprion, a related holocephalid that shares similar traits to it, including the helical whorl of teeth.

Description

One of the primary qualities that separate Parahelicoprion from Helicoprion is the shape, thickness, and angle of the tooth whorl. Its teeth protrude outwards not like a tightly coiled saw, but instead a curved arrangement of cutting blades indicating it relied less on crushing slow-moving invertebrates and catching cephalopods, or other small mollusk prey, but inflicting traumatic damage against more durable, faster prey. Their teeth grew at a much slower pace than those of other whorl-tooth sharks, resulting in a depreciated spiral, growing only half of the teeth a Helicoprion would grow in its lifetime. The tooth spiral also was able to indicate the age of the eugeneodontidans in question.

Largest Parahelicoprion probably reached  in length, making them along with Helicoprion the largest animals of Paleozoic era.

Paleobiology
Parahelicoprion is thought to have been a nektonic carnivore that probably preyed upon a variety of different species, using its blade-like teeth to cut at exposed flesh like a hatchet or wedge.

References 

Agassizodontidae
Prehistoric cartilaginous fish genera
Permian cartilaginous fish
Permian fish of Asia
Fossils of Russia
Prehistoric fish of South America
Permian Bolivia
Fossils of Bolivia
Fossil taxa described in 1916